Bariamyrma (from "Baria", name of a river; Latin hispidula, diminutive for "hairy, bristly") is a genus of ants in the subfamily Myrmicinae containing the single species Bariamyrma hispidula. The genus is known only from queens from Venezuela.

References

External links

Myrmicinae
Monotypic ant genera
Hymenoptera of South America